Andrea, Paano Ba ang Maging Isang Ina? (Andrea, How Is It Like to Be a Mother?) is a 1990 Filipino film and an official entry to the 1990 Metro Manila Film Festival.

The film won for Aunor all the Best Actress Awards given by the five annual award-giving bodies in the Philippines that time. The film was also awarded Best Picture by the Filipino Academy of Movie Arts and Sciences, the Young Critics Circle, and the PMPC Star Awards for Movies.

Synopsis
Andrea, whose is now about to give birth decided to go to Manila to escape being chased by the military, along with her husband Momoy. In Manila, she lived with her friend Joyce.

Cast
Nora Aunor as Andrea
Gina Alajar as Joyce
Llyod Samartino as Emil
Dan Alvaro
Perla Bautista
Juan Rodrigo as Momoy
RR Herrera as Gabriel/Raymond

Awards

References

External links
 
 

Filipino-language films
1990 films
Films set in the Philippines
Philippine drama films
Films directed by Gil Portes